Arpat Avanesyan is a Physicist and legislator from Artsakh.
Avanesyan is a past Rector of the State University of Mountainous Karabakh.
He chairs the legislature's Finance Committee.

References 

People from the Republic of Artsakh
Living people
Year of birth missing (living people)
Place of birth missing (living people)
Azerbaijani physicists